Rafael Ramos de Lima (born 8 March 1986), known as Rafael Lima, is a Brazilian footballer who plays for América Mineiro as a central defender.

Club career
Rafael Lima was born in Florianópolis, Santa Catarina, and spent his youth career at Figueirense. Making his debut as a senior while on loan at Atlético Sorocaba in 2006, he made his Série A debut on 20 May 2007 by starting in a 1–2 away loss against Palmeiras.

Rafael Lima spent another temporary deal at Ceará in 2008 before being released by Figueira in June 2009. He subsequently moved abroad, joining UAE Arabian Gulf League club Al-Sharjah SCC.

Returning to Brazil in 2010, Rafael Lima spent nine months unemployed before joining Internacional de Santa Maria for 2011 Campeonato Gaúcho. In December 2011, after a short stint at Hercílio Luz, he signed for Chapecoense.

Rafael Lima was an undisputed starter during Chapecoense's consecutive promotions in 2012 and 2013, being a captain during the process. He scored his first goal in the main category of Brazilian football on 3 August 2014, netting the game's only in a home success over Flamengo.

Rafael Lima was not on board the ill-fated LaMia Airlines Flight 2933 that crashed on 28 November 2016, and killed 19 of his teammates. On 24 December, he was released by the club.
 
In 2017 He plays for América Mineiro

Career statistics

References

External links

1986 births
Living people
Brazilian footballers
Association football defenders
Campeonato Brasileiro Série A players
Campeonato Brasileiro Série B players
Campeonato Brasileiro Série C players
Figueirense FC players
Clube Atlético Sorocaba players
Ceará Sporting Club players
Esporte Clube Internacional players
Associação Chapecoense de Futebol players
América Futebol Clube (MG) players
UAE Pro League players
Brazilian expatriate footballers
Brazilian expatriate sportspeople in the United Arab Emirates
Expatriate footballers in the United Arab Emirates
Sportspeople from Florianópolis